Biggar Museum Trust (BMT) is an independent charity based in and around the town of Biggar in South Lanarkshire, Scotland. The late Brian Lambie began a remarkable collection of artefacts from the area over some 40 years, and with a number of others created BMT which became responsible for a number of museums. It became apparent to the Trustees that the buildings were not able to meet modern requirements, were difficult to access and expensive to maintain and develop.

In 2010 an opportunity arose to acquire a large site in the centre of the town, and a project to create a new museum to bring the collections together and meet current requirements and visitor aspirations. The cost of the project was £2.2 million, of which more than half was raised from within the town and scattered rural community of the area, together with Funding from the Clyde Wind Farm Community Fund, South Lanarkshire LEADER, Museums Galleries Scotland and a number of private trusts. The new museum was designed to meet high standards and is fully accessible, with a dedicated parking area for cars and a coach.

Biggar & Upper Clydesdale Museum opened to visitors on 28 July 2015. It has a historical gallery illustrating the history of the area from early times up to the 20th century, a street of shops recreated from the town and furnished from the collection, and a special exhibition room which can house items loaned from national collections.

BMT is also responsible for 

 Holy Trinity Chapel an Oxford Movement restored chapel built to serve Lamington House [now demolished] about 3 miles from Biggar.

 Brownsbank Cottage, former home of Hugh MacDiarmid, with a live-in writer in residence, who produces works in Lowland Scots. This is only open by appointment and is about 5 miles from Biggar.

 The Biggar Gasworks Museum is housed in the last existing gasworks in Scotland where coal was used to make town gas before the introduction of natural gas

Biggar also contains The Puppet Theatre and the Corn Exchange Theatre and Art Gallery. Biggar has strong connections with William Wallace, with a small bridge in the town being associated with him, although his connection to Lanark is better known.

External links
Biggar & Upper Clydesdale Museum - official site

Museums in South Lanarkshire
History museums in Scotland
Biggar, South Lanarkshire